Rustam Zairovich Zabirov (born 23 October 1966) is Uzbek-Tajik football manager and former football player and coach. He played for Pamir Dushanbe, Navbahor Namangan, Rubin Kazan and other clubs.

Club career
In 1991, he moved from Pamir Dushanbe to Navbahor Namangan. In 1991 season he played 35 matches for Navbahor in Soviet First League, scoring 19 goals. One year later, in first season of Uzbek League, Zabirov completed 30 matches and scored 15 goals, becoming the best season top scorer of club.

In 1992, he moved to SV Meppen to play in 2.Bundesliga. In 1992-1993 season he played 10 matches for SV Meppen. From 1996 to 1997 he played for Rubin Kazan.

Zabirov later signed for National Football League (India) side Vasco SC in 2000. He has also made several appearances for Goa Professional League. With Vasco, he played more than ten matches in the 5th National Football League (2000/01) until September 2021.

He retired form professional football on 1 July 2002.

International career
Zabirov represented both Uzbekistan and Tajikistan at international level.

Managerial career
From 2008 to 2010 he was head coach of Qizilqum Zarafshon. On 27 August 2010 he resigned his post, after Qizilqum lost in away match against Olmaliq FK.

In January 2013 he started to work as assistant coach to Azamat Abduraimov at FK Andijan. On 5 April 2013 he was appointed as head coach of Qizilqum Zarafshon again, after Ravshan Khaydarov resigned his post. On 23 July 2013 he was sacked from his post and left the club.

Career statistics

International

International goals

Scores and results list Tajikistan's goal tally first, score column indicates score after each Tajikistan goal.

Honours

Club
Navbahor
 Uzbek Cup  Champions (2): 1992, 1995

References

External links
 

1966 births
Living people
Soviet footballers
Uzbekistani footballers
Uzbekistan international footballers
Uzbekistani expatriate footballers
CSKA Pamir Dushanbe players
FC Shinnik Yaroslavl players
FC Rubin Kazan players
SV Meppen players
Vakhsh Qurghonteppa players
Soviet Top League players
2. Bundesliga players
Footballers at the 1998 Asian Games
Association football forwards
Expatriate footballers in India
Expatriate footballers in Russia
Expatriate footballers in Germany
Uzbekistani expatriate sportspeople in India
Uzbekistani expatriate sportspeople in Russia
Uzbekistani expatriate sportspeople in Germany
Asian Games competitors for Uzbekistan